Wheeler is a surname of English origin. It is an occupational name, originally describing one who makes or uses wheels.

People
 Allen Wheeler (born 1989), British airplane pilot
 Albert H. Wheeler (1915–1994), American academic and politician
 A. Harry Wheeler (1873–1950), American mathematician and mathematics teacher
 Alison Wheeler (born 1972), British singer
 Alison Wheeler (comedian) (born 1986), French comedian and actress
 Alwynne Cooper Wheeler (1929-2005), British ichthyologist
 Andrew R. Wheeler, American lawyer
 Anna Wheeler (died 1848), Anglo-Irish author
 Anne Wheeler (born 1946), Canadian film and television director
 Benjamin Ide Wheeler (1854–1927), American academic
 Bert Wheeler (1895–1968), American comedian
 Bessie Wheeler (born 1876), painter 
 Billy Edd Wheeler (born 1932), American songwriter, performer, writer and visual artist
 Blake Wheeler (born 1986), American ice hockey player
 Burton K. Wheeler (1882–1975), American politician
 Candace Wheeler (1827–1923), American interior and textile designer
 Caron Wheeler (born 1963), English R&B singer
 Charles Wheeler (disambiguation), several people
 Cheryl Wheeler (born 1951), American singer-songwriter
 Chris Wheeler (born 1945), American announcer and color commentator
 Clayton L. Wheeler (1876–1950), New York politician
 Cora Stuart Wheeler (1852–1897), American poet, author
 Damen Wheeler (born 1977), American football player
 Dan Wheeler (born 1977), American baseball pitcher
 Daniel Wheeler (born 1987), American professional wrestler
 David Wheeler (disambiguation), several people
 Donald Niven Wheeler (1913–2002) American academic and bureaucrat, accused spy, brother of George Shaw Wheeler
 Donald J. Wheeler, American statistician and author
 Earle Wheeler (1908–1975), American general
 Edwin Wheeler (1828–1864), American legislator and jurist
 Ella Wheeler Wilcox, (1850–1919), American poet
 Ellen Wheeler (born 1961), American actress
 Erica Wheeler (disambiguation), several people
 Everett P. Wheeler (1840–1925), American politician
 Felix Wheeler, British functionary, the Crown Equerry
 Flex Wheeler (born 1965), American professional bodybuilder
 Floyd E. Wheeler (1905-1995), American politician
 Sir Frederick Wheeler (public servant) (1914–1994), Australian public servant
 Gary Wheeler (disambiguation), several people
 Geoffrey Wheeler (disambiguation), several people
 George Shaw Wheeler (1908–1998), American economist, defector, brother of Donald Niven Wheeler
 Golden "Big" Wheeler (1929–1998), American blues singer, harmonicist and songwriter
 Harold Wheeler (disambiguation), several people
 Harry Wheeler (disambiguation), several people
 Heneage Wheeler, English cricketer
 Homer W. Wheeler (1848–1930), American military officer and author
 Hugh Wheeler (1912–1987), English writer
 Humpy Wheeler (Howard Augustine Wheeler, born 1938), American auto racing promoter and track owner
 J. Wheeler (Middlesex cricketer) (dates unknown), an 18th-century English professional cricketer
 Jacquetta Wheeler, British model
 James Wheeler (disambiguation), several people
 Jason Wheeler (born 1990), baseball player
 Jillian Wheeler (born 1991), American actress and singer
 John Wheeler (disambiguation), several people
 John Wheeler-Bennett (1902–1975), British historian
 Johnny Wheeler (1928-2019), footballer for Tranmere Rovers, Bolton Wanderers, Liverpool, New Brighton
 Jordan Wheeler (19??), Cree-American writer
 Joseph Wheeler (disambiguation), several people
 Kenny Wheeler (1930–2014), Canadian composer
 Kristiina Wheeler (born 1983), Finnish singer and television hostess
 Lloyd Garrison Wheeler (1848-1909), American businessman and philanthropist
 Louis Cutter Wheeler (1910–1980), American botanist
 Lucille Wheeler (born 1935), Canadian alpine skier
 Maggie Wheeler (born 1961), American actress
 Marcy Wheeler, American independent journalist
 Mary Sparkes Wheeler (1835–1919), British-born American author, poet, lecturer
 Matthew Wheeler (born 1962), English cricketer
 Maureen Wheeler, co-founder of Lonely Planet Publications
 Michael Wheeler (disambiguation), multiple people
 Sir Mortimer Wheeler (1890–1976), British archaeologist
 Nathaniel Wheeler, American businessman
 Nicholas Wheeler (born 1965), British businessman
 Nick Wheeler (born 1982), American rock musician
 Nicola Wheeler (born 1974), English actress
 Sir Neil Wheeler (1917–2009), Royal Air Force officer
 Osmer B. Wheeler (1809–1906), New York politician
 Paul Wheeler (footballer) (born 1965), Welsh footballer
 Paul Wheeler (writer), British screenwriter and novelist
 Paul James Wheeler (born 1947), Welsh rugby union player
 Peter Wheeler (disambiguation), several people
 Philip Wheeler, American football player
 Quentin Wheeler, American Olympic hurdler
 Quentin D. Wheeler (born 1954), American entomologist
 Robert Wheeler (disambiguation), including Bob and Bobby Wheeler
 Roger Wheeler (disambiguation), several people
 Roy Wheeler (disambiguation), several people
 Ryan Wheeler, (born 1988), American baseball player
 Ryan Wheeler (baseball coach) (born 1971), American college baseball coach
 Schuyler Wheeler (1860–1923), American engineer, inventor of the electric fan
 Seager Wheeler (1868–1961), MBE, Canadian agronomist, pioneered economically viable wheat strains and fruit for dryland prairie farming
 Shannon Wheeler, American cartoonist
 Stuart Wheeler (1935–2020), British businessman and politician
 Tessa Wheeler, British Archaeologist
 Thomas Wheeler (disambiguation), several people
 Tim Wheeler (born 1977), Irish rock musician
 Tim Wheeler (academic), Vice-Chancellor of the University of Chester
 Tim Wheeler (baseball) (born 1988),  outfielder in the Colorado Rockies organization
 Tony Wheeler, co-founder of Lonely Planet Publications
 Wayne Wheeler (1869–1927), American temperance activist
 William Wheeler (disambiguation), several people
 Wilson Roy Wheeler (1905–1988), Australian ornithologist
 Zack Wheeler (born 1990), baseball player
 Zelous Wheeler (born 1987), baseball player

Fictional characters
 Joey Wheeler, from the Japanese anime Yu-Gi-Oh!
 Megan Wheeler, from the American TV series Law & Order: Criminal Intent
 Mike Wheeler, from the American TV series Stranger Things
 Nancy Wheeler, from the American TV series Stranger Things
 April and Frank Wheeler, from the book Revolutionary Road and its movie adaptation Revolutionary Road
 Jake Wheeler, from the American TV series Chucky

References

See also 
 Justice Wheeler (disambiguation)
 Wheeler (given name)
 Wheeler (disambiguation)
 Wheler

English-language surnames
Occupational surnames
English-language occupational surnames